Kmetija 2022 (The Farm 2022) is the eleventh season of the Slovene reality television series Kmetija. The season takes place on a newly built farm estate in the Lower Carniola of Slovenia. Natalija Bratkovič returns to host with 16 new Slovenians live like it was 100 years prior to try and run a farm whilst trying to avoid being eliminated via duels to make it to the end and win a grand prize of €50,000 and the title of Kmetija 2022. The season premieres on Pop TV on 31 August 2022.

Contestants

Challengers
New this season consists of Challengers. Four former contestants of Kmetija live in a tent competing in a challenge against the duelists for a chance to replace them and enter the farm as fully integrated contestants.

The game

Notes

References

External links

The Farm (franchise)
2020s Slovenian television series